Corporal Henry Fred Warner (August 23, 1923December 21, 1944) was a United States Army soldier who received the Medal of Honor for his heroic actions during World War II.

Biography
Henry Fred Warner joined the United States Army from his birth city in January 1943, and by December 20, 1944, was serving as a Corporal in the Antitank Company of the 2d Battalion, 26th Infantry, 1st Infantry Division. During a battle on that day, near Bütgenbach, Belgium, Warner continued to man his anti-tank gun through the night and into the next morning, despite intense fire from the approaching German tanks. He successfully disabled several enemy tanks before being killed in action. He was posthumously awarded the Medal of Honor six months later, on June 23, 1945.

Warner, aged 21 at his death, was buried at Southside Cemetery in his hometown of Troy, North Carolina.

Medal of Honor citation

Legacy
Warner Barracks in Bamberg, West Germany was named in honor of him.

See also
List of Medal of Honor recipients
List of Medal of Honor recipients for World War II

References

External links

 

1923 births
1944 deaths
Burials in North Carolina
Deaths by firearm in Belgium
Military personnel from North Carolina
People from Montgomery County, North Carolina
United States Army Medal of Honor recipients
United States Army personnel killed in World War II
United States Army non-commissioned officers
World War II recipients of the Medal of Honor